European route E 125 is a Class A in Russia, Kazakhstan and Kyrgyzstan.

Itinerary 
The E 125 routes through 3 countries:

71A-1011/71A-1109: Ishim - Kazanskoye - border with Kazakhstan

: Sokolovka – Petropavl – border of Russia
: Petropavl - Kokshetau - Astana
: Astana – Karaganda – Almaty
: Almaty - Kaskelen - Kenen
 (Branch): Kenen - Korday - Border of Kyrgyzstan

  ЭМ-01 Road: Border of Kazakhstan - Georgievka - Bishkek
  ЭМ-11 Road: Bishkek - Torugart Pass - Border of China ( connects ))

External links 
 UN Economic Commission for Europe: Overall Map of E-road Network (2007)

125
E125
E125